This is a list of windmills in the English county of South Yorkshire.

Locations

Sources
Unless otherwise indicated, the source for all entries is:-  or the linked Windmill World page.

References

History of Yorkshire
Windmills in South Yorkshire
South Yorkshire
Windmills in Yorkshire